Carrick-on-Shannon railway station serves the town of Carrick-on-Shannon. Whilst the town itself is in County Leitrim, the railway station lies across the border in neighbouring County Roscommon in the small area of Cortober or Mullaghmore.

The station opened on 3 December 1862.

See also
 List of railway stations in Ireland

References

External links
Irish Rail Carrick-on-Shannon station website

Carrick-on-Shannon
Iarnród Éireann stations in County Roscommon
Railway stations in County Roscommon
Railway stations opened in 1862
1862 establishments in Ireland
Railway stations in the Republic of Ireland opened in the 19th century